Coleophora subula is a moth of the family Coleophoridae. It is found in Hungary, Slovakia, Russia (central Siberia, Altai, Lower Wolga region), Tajikistan, Turkmenistan, Turkey and China (Xinjiang).

References

subtremula
Moths of Europe
Moths of Asia
Moths described in 1993